Grand Slam is the fourth studio album by Australian rock band Spiderbait. The album marked a significant change in sound for the band, with many of the songs being heavily produced pop sung by bassist Janet English. The remainder of the album is a mix of alternative rock (sung, as on previous albums, by drummer Kram) and electronica.

The song "Glokenpop" (also spelt "Glockenpop") is featured in the 2009 video game LittleBigPlanet for PlayStation Portable.

Track listing

Charts

Certifications

Release history

References 

1999 albums
Spiderbait albums